The Hutan Pinus/Janthoi Nature Reserve is a restricted nature reserve located near the city of Kota Jantho in the north west tip of the island of Sumatra in Indonesia. It was established in 1984.

References 

Protected areas of Indonesia
1984 establishments in Indonesia
Protected areas established in 1984